St Matthew's Church is an Anglican parish church in the village of Blackmoor, Hampshire, England. It is a Grade II* listed building. The church was designed by Alfred Waterhouse for Roundell Palmer, later 1st Earl of Selborne (1882).

History

Background
The earliest record of a chapel in Blackmoor comes from a tithe return of 1254, which states that the parish of Selborne was owed returns from chapels in both Blackmoor and neighbouring Oakhanger. In 1291, a tax return for the ecclesia de Seleburne cum capella covered the Blackmoor chapel, and the prior and convent of Selborne were said to be "the impropriators of the parish church of Seleborne with the chapels of Oakhanger and Blakemere [sic]" in a 1352 vicarial portion. A century later, repairs to the Blackmoor chapel were paid for by the  prior and convent of Selborne in 1462.

19th-century church
Sir Roundell Palmer bought the manor of Blackmoor in 1865 and moved there in 1866. At the time there was a chapel of ease in the village, presumably the one mentioned in the Background section above, but the Palmer family would attend Sunday service at St Mary's in Selborne and evensong at the Old Church in Greatham. Following consultation with the pastor at St Mary's, Selborne, Palmer decided to build a new church in the village, as well as a vicarage, cottages and schools.

Her chose Alfred Waterhouse as architect.

The church is built from pale grey malm stone from a local quarry, with fine-grained Bath stone for the dressings and quoins.
 
A plaque on a white marble pillar on the north side of the chancel was dedicated by the village to Palmer and his wife, and reads: "In gratitude for all the good that under God has come to this parish through their devotion to their Saviour and their love to their fellow men."

Gallery

External links
Official website
 The London Gazette pages 1 and 2 delineating the bounds of the new parish of Blackmoor, 25 February 1870

References

19th-century Church of England church buildings
Alfred Waterhouse buildings
Church of England church buildings in Hampshire
Churches completed in 1869
Gothic Revival church buildings in England
Gothic Revival architecture in Hampshire
Grade II* listed churches in Hampshire